This is a complete list, in alphabetical order, of cricketers who played for Nottingham Cricket Club in first-class cricket matches. Nottingham played a total of 15 first-class matches, 13 of them between 1826 and 1834 and two in 1848 after the establishment of Nottinghamshire County Cricket Club in 1841. 

Teams played under the Nottinghamshire name from 1829 onwards and many of the players listed also played for Nottinghamshire teams. A Nottinghamshire and Leicestershire combined team also played one match in 1803 which has been given first-class status and Nottinghamshire sides played eight first-class matches between 1835 and 1840. Players who played in matches for these teams or Nottinghamshire only are not included in this list. Note that many players represented other teams besides Nottingham.

A

B

C

D

F

G

H

J

K

M

N

O

P

R

S

T

U

V

W

See also
 List of Nottinghamshire County Cricket Club players

Notes

References

Nottingham